John Hus  is a 1977 American film biography of the 14th-century Czech church reformer Jan Hus, directed by Michael Economou. The film was produced by Faith For Today Ministries, the creators of a Christian TV program of the same name.

The film featured Rod Colbin in the title role.

References

External links
 

1977 films
Biographical films about religious leaders
Films set in the 15th century
Cultural depictions of Jan Hus
1970s English-language films
American biographical films
1970s American films